The Corridor IV is one of the Pan-European transport corridors. It runs between Dresden/Nuremberg in Germany and Thessaloniki (Greece) / Constanța (Romania) / Istanbul (Turkey). The corridor follows the route: Dresden / Nuremberg – Prague – Vienna – Bratislava – Győr – Budapest – Arad – Bucharest – Constanța / Craiova – Sofia  – Pernik - Thessaloniki or Plovdiv – Istanbul.

The corridor is the shortest land connection between Greece and Central Europe completely on EU territory.
It bypasses the countries of former Yugoslavia and the former Brotherhood and Unity Highway (now part of Pan-European Corridor X).

The Vidin–Calafat Bridge across Danube river is one important part of the route.
It is one of only two bridges connecting Romania and Bulgaria.

References

04
Roads in Germany
Roads in the Czech Republic
Roads in Slovakia
Roads in Hungary
Roads in Romania
Roads in Bulgaria
Roads in Greece
Roads in Turkey